Department of Excise & Taxation, Haryana is a Ministry and department of the Government of Haryana  in India.

Description
This department came into existence when Haryana was established as a new state within India after being separated from Punjab. Dushyant chautala is the cabinet minister responsible for this department from October 2019.

See also
 Government of Haryana

References

Excise and Taxation
Economy of Haryana